Order in mathematics may refer to:

Set theory
 Total order and partial order, a binary relation generalizing the usual ordering of numbers and of words in a dictionary
 Ordered set
 Order in Ramsey theory, uniform structures in consequence to critical set cardinality

Algebra
Order (group theory), the cardinality of a group or period of an element
 Order of a polynomial (disambiguation)
Order of a square matrix, its dimension
Order (ring theory), an algebraic structure
Ordered group
Ordered field

Analysis
Order (differential equation) or order of highest derivative, of a differential equation
Leading-order terms
NURBS order, a number one greater than the degree of the polynomial representation of a non-uniform rational B-spline
Order of convergence, a measurement of convergence
Order of derivation
Order of an entire function
Order of a power series, the lowest degree of its terms
Ordered list, a sequence or tuple
Orders of approximation in Big O notation
Z-order (curve), a space-filling curve

Arithmetic
Multiplicative order in modular arithmetic
Order of operations
Orders of magnitude, a class of scale or magnitude of any amount

Combinatorics
Order in the Josephus permutation
Ordered selections and partitions of the twelvefold way in combinatorics
Ordered set, a  bijection, cyclic order, or permutation
Unordered subset or combination
Weak order of permutations

Fractals
Complexor, or complex order in fractals
Order of extension in Lakes of Wada
Order of fractal dimension (Rényi dimensions)
Orders of construction in the Pythagoras tree

Geometry
Long-range aperiodic order, in pinwheel tiling, for instance

Graphs
Graph order, the number of nodes in a graph
First order and second order logic of graphs
Topological ordering of directed acyclic graphs
Degeneracy ordering of undirected graphs
Elimination ordering of chordal graphs
Order, the complexity of a structure within a graph: see haven (graph theory) and bramble (graph theory)

Logic 
In logic, model theory and type theory:

 Zeroth-order logic
 First-order logic
 Second-order logic
 Higher-order logic

Order theory 

Order (journal), an academic journal on order theory
Dense order, a total order wherein between any unequal pair of elements there is always an intervening element in the order
Glossary of order theory
Lexicographical order, an ordering method on sequences analogous to alphabetical order on words
List of order topics, list of order theory topics
Order theory, study of various binary relations known as orders
Order topology, a topology of total order for totally ordered sets
Ordinal numbers, numbers assigned to sets based on their set-theoretic order
Partial order, often called just "order" in order theory texts, a transitive antisymmetric relation
Total order, a partial order that is also total, in that either the relation or its inverse holds between any unequal elements

Statistics 
Order statistics
First-order statistics, e.g., arithmetic mean, median, quantiles
Second-order statistics, e.g., correlation, power spectrum, variance
Higher-order statistics, e.g., bispectrum, kurtosis, skewness

Mathematical terminology